Los Bastardos Finlandeses is a band from Helsinki, Finland. They have toured with Lemmy and company as well as Aerosmith and Deep Purple.

In February 2010, they did their debut UK tour covering the key cities London, Oxford, Birmingham and Liverpool. Their fourth album titled "Saved By Rock'n'Roll" came out on the bands's label 100% Record Company in February 2011 and debuted at #9 on Finland's Rumba Magazine's "indie record-label" charts, the chart leaving out large chain stores. "Saved By Rock'n'Roll" was also introduced on the Finnish album charts at #30.

Current band members
 El Taff Bastardo (Bryn Jones) - lead vocals & bass guitar
 El Bastardo Grande (Twist Twist Erkinharju) - drums
 Don Osmo (Olli Kykkänen) - guitar & vocals
 Young Gun (Ailu Immonen) - guitar & vocals

Discography

Albums

Singles

References

External links
 

Finnish heavy metal musical groups
Musical groups from Helsinki